Peter Lunenfeld (born 1962, in New York City) is a critic and theorist of digital media, digital humanities, and urban humanities. He is a professor and the Vice Chair of the Design Media Arts department at UCLA, director of the Institute for Technology and Aesthetics (ITA), and founder of mediawork: The Southern California New Media Group.

Lunenfeld is a leading figure in digital aesthetic theory, set on establishing philosophical quandaries regarding digital technology and its role in art, design and culture. Works like Snap to Grid and The Secret War Between Downloading and Uploading incorporate traditional and continental theories of art to account for digital media. His work revolves around the discourses of technology, aesthetics, and cultural theory, establishing the complexity of digital aesthetics while simultaneously categorizing it.

His books include City at the Edge of Forever, Digital_Humanities, USER, Snap to Grid, and The Digital Dialectic.  Lunenfeld is the editorial director of the highly designed Mediawork pamphlet series for the MIT Press. The series features commissioned writings that weave life stories into "theoretical and critical praxis." These award-winning "theoretical fetish objects" cover the intersections of art, design, technology, and market culture.  Included in the series is  Utopian Entrepreneur (2001) by Brenda Laurel, designed by Denise Gonzales Crisp; Writing Machines (2002) by N. Katherine Hayles, designed by Anne Burdick; Rhythm Science (2004) by Paul D. Miller aka DJ Spooky that Subliminal Kid, designed by COMA; and, Shaping Things (2005) by Bruce Sterling, designed by Lorraine Wild. Lev Manovich, the author of The Language of New Media, lauded these 100 page "mind bombs" in the tradition of McLuhan and Fiore¹s The Medium is the Massage as a new operating system for the book.

Lunenfeld has a B.A. in history from Columbia University, an MA in Media Studies from SUNY Buffalo, and a Ph.D. from UCLA in Film & Television. He worked as the Applications Coordinator at the Academy Award winning hardware and software company Lyon Lamb. Honors and fellowships include a 2016 Internal Award for Art Criticism (from the IAAC), the Dorothy Lee Prize for Scholarship in 2013 (from the MEA), and fellowships at the Huntington Library (Dana and David Dornsife Fellow, 2015-16), USC Annenberg Center (Vectors, 2007), and the Columbia University Institute for Scholars at Reid Hall in Paris (2005). He lives in Los Angeles, California.

Related books
 Peter Lunenfeld: City at the Edge of Forever: Los Angeles Reimagined, Viking, August 2020 
 Peter Lunenfeld, Anne Burdick, Johanna Drucker, Todd Presner, Jeffrey Schnapp: Digital Humanities, MIT Press, November 2012 
 Peter Lunenfeld: The Secret War Between Downloading and Uploading: Tales of the Computer as Culture Machine, MIT Press, April 2011 
 Peter Lunenfeld: USER:InfoTechnoDemo, MIT Press (2005), visuals Mieke Gerritzen 
 Peter Lunenfeld: Snap to Grid: A User's Guide to Digital Arts, Media and Cultures, MIT Press  (2000) 
 Peter Lunenfeld, ed.: The Digital Dialectic: New Essays on New Media, MIT Press (1999)

References

External links
Official website
UCLA Design Media Arts Department homepage
Mediawork Project homepage

1962 births
American mass media scholars
Columbia College (New York) alumni
Date of birth missing (living people)
Digital media educators
Living people
Writers from New York City
University at Buffalo alumni
UCLA Film School alumni
UCLA School of the Arts and Architecture faculty